Pain Assessment in Advanced Dementia (PAINAD) is a pain scale developed by Victoria Warden, Ann C. Hurley, and Ladislav Volicer to provide a universal method of analysing the pain experienced by people in late stage dementia.

"The total score ranges from 0-10 points. A possible interpretation of the scores is: 1-3=mild pain; 4-6=moderate pain; 
7-10=severe pain."

See also
 FLACC scale - a pain scale for children

References

Medical assessment and evaluation instruments
Dementia
Medical scales